Neil Cassidy (or similar) may refer to:

Neil Cassidy (soccer), coach of Rochester Thunder
Neal Cassady, writer
Neal Cassidy, fictional character in Once Upon A Time